In decision theory, subjective expected utility is the attractiveness of an economic opportunity as perceived by a decision-maker in the presence of risk.  Characterizing the behavior of decision-makers as using subjective expected utility was promoted and axiomatized by L. J. Savage in 1954 following previous work by Ramsey and von Neumann. The theory of subjective expected utility combines two subjective concepts: first, a personal utility function, and second a personal probability distribution (usually based on Bayesian probability theory).

Savage proved that, if the decision-maker adheres to axioms of rationality, believing an uncertain event has possible outcomes  each with a utility of  then the person's choices can be explained as arising from this utility function combined with the subjective belief that there is a probability of each outcome,  The subjective expected utility is the resulting  expected value of the utility,

If instead of choosing  the person were to choose  the person's subjective expected utility would be

Which decision the person prefers depends on which subjective expected utility is higher. Different people may make different decisions because they may have different utility functions or different beliefs about the probabilities of different outcomes.

Savage assumed that it is possible to take convex combinations of decisions  and that preferences would be preserved.

Experiments have shown that many individuals do not behave in a manner consistent with Savage's axioms of subjective expected utility, e.g. most prominently Allais (1953)  
and Ellsberg (1961).

Notes

References 
  http://psychclassics.yorku.ca/Peirce/small-diffs.htm
 Ramsey, Frank Plumpton; “Truth and Probability” ( PDF), Chapter VII in The Foundations of Mathematics and other Logical Essays (1931).
 de Finetti, Bruno. "Probabilism: A Critical Essay on the Theory of Probability and on the Value of Science," (translation of 1931 article) in Erkenntnis, volume 31, September 1989.
 de Finetti, Bruno. 1937, “La Prévision: ses lois logiques, ses sources subjectives,” Annales de l'Institut Henri Poincaré,
 de Finetti, Bruno.  "Foresight: its Logical Laws, Its Subjective Sources," (translation of the  1937 article in French) in H. E. Kyburg and H. E. Smokler (eds), Studies in Subjective Probability, New York: Wiley, 1964.
 de Finetti, Bruno. Theory of Probability, (translation by AFM Smith of 1970 book) 2 volumes, New York: Wiley, 1974–5.

External links 
 

Social philosophy
Expected utility